"These Days" is the fourth single from Australian alternative rockers, Gyroscope's third studio album, Breed Obsession. It was released as a digital download by Warner Music on iTunes on 1 November 2008, containing two previously unreleased B-sides. The song, together with the rest of the album was recorded at Elevator Studios in Liverpool with Dave Eringa (Idlewild, Manic Street Preachers). The song has been a part of the band's live show since the album's release. In October 2008, Gyroscope posted a live video of the song on their Myspace profile, which Daniel Sanders, their lead singer described "We took a lot of time and care recording this one, as we wanted to make sure it was stamped with that proper English guitar tone."

A review on Australian music website, Faster Louder, regarding the song, states "A simply classic guitar riff from Zoran [Trivic] starts things off while a ticking drumbeat supplements Daniel’s "un, deux, trois" count in. Memorable guitar chords and tight drumming perfectly complement what will surely become another Gyroscope classic." TheDwarf website reviewer, Rebelution, described their live performance in May 2012 "[they] launched straight into 'These Days' and 'Confidence in Confidentiality' with an energy and enthusiasm that was maintained throughout the night. Even their more mellow songs, like 'These Days', were given an intense and vibrant edge."

Track listing

Personnel

Gyroscope Daniel Sanders – guitar, vocals
 Zoran Trivic – guitar, vocals
 Brad Campbell – bass, vocals
 Rob Nassif – drums

ProductionDave Eringa – producer, mixing, sound engineer
Howie Weinberg - mastering
Sean Genockey - mixing
Sean Sinnott - sound engineer

References

2008 singles
Gyroscope (band) songs
Song recordings produced by Dave Eringa